Agonopterix purpurea is a moth of the family Depressariidae. It is found in most of Europe.

The wingspan is 13–15 mm. The head is grey, face white. Forewings are crimson-fuscous, mixed with dark fuscous and whitish, especially towards costa; base more whitish; first discal stigma black, posteriorly whitish-edged, preceded by a similar dot obliquely above it, second white, edged with dark fuscous; between and above these a dark fuscous blotch reaching costa. Hindwings light grey, darker posteriorly. The larva is yellowish; head and plate of 2 black

Adults are on wing from August to May or June.

The larvae feed on Anthriscus sylvestris, Chaerophyllum temulum, Daucus carota and Torilis japonica.
They initially create a small, irregular, full depth mine with conspicuous frass. They soon vacate the mine and continue feeding in a tubular rolled leaf. Larvae can be found from May to early June. They are green with darker length lines and a shining black head. The species overwinters as an adult. Pupation takes place in a cocoon in the earth.

References

External links
lepiforum.de

Moths described in 1811
Agonopterix
Moths of Europe